is a Japanese professional ice hockey forward currently playing for East Hokkaido Cranes of the Asia League.

He played one season in the Japan League's now defunct team, the Sapporo Polaris. He also played in the Japan national team in every major tournament they have played since 2003.

From 1999-2001, he played for the Snow Brand Sapporo. From 2001-2002, he played for the Sapporo Polaris. From 2002-2003, he played for the Oji Seishi. From 2003-2014, he played for the Oji Eagles. He then played for the Nikkō Ice Bucks from 2014 to 2019.

References

External links

1981 births
Asian Games gold medalists for Japan
Asian Games silver medalists for Japan
Asian Games medalists in ice hockey
Japanese ice hockey forwards
Living people
Medalists at the 2003 Asian Winter Games
Medalists at the 2007 Asian Winter Games
Medalists at the 2011 Asian Winter Games
Ice hockey players at the 2003 Asian Winter Games
Ice hockey players at the 2007 Asian Winter Games
Ice hockey players at the 2011 Asian Winter Games
Nikkō Ice Bucks players
Oji Eagles players
People from Kushiro, Hokkaido
Sportspeople from Hokkaido